Aung Thu (born 22 May 1995) is a Burmese professional footballer who plays as forward for Thai League 1 club Lamphun Warriors and Myanmar national team. He has represented Myanmar internationally at under-17, under-20, under-23, and senior level. Representing Myanmar at the 2015 FIFA U-20 World Cup in New Zealand, he scored his debut World Cup goal against New Zealand national under-20 football team.

Early life
He was born in Pindale Village of Meiktila Township, Myanmar. Later he moved to Pyinmana.

Club career

Early career
In 2009, at the age of 13, Aung Thu represented Pyinmana in U-19 Division Tournament with 3 goals. He later joined the Myanmar Football Academy in Mandalay and was graduated from the academy.

Yadanarbon
In 2013, Yadanarbon F.C signed Aung Thu from Myanmar Football Academy (Mandalay). He showed an impressive talent in Yadanarbon F.C that increased his value to the whole team by achieving a less than anticipated goal count by assisting other teammates in making goals. 

At the 2016 and 2017 MNL Awards Night, he was recognized as the MNL Best Player of the Year.

Police Tero (loan)
In November 2017, Aung Thu signed on as a loan for Thailand club Police Tero formally known as BEC Tero Sasana for the 2018 season. He scored goals and assisted others in theirs; he was recognized as the league player of the month. His goal during the Thai League Week 11 against Sukhothai FC is considered one of the top 5 goals of the round.

Muangthong United (loan)
Aung Thu joined Muangthong United on loan for the 2019 season with options.

Buriram United
In December 2020, Aung Thu signed for Thai League Giant Club Buriram United for US$50,000. On 26 December 2020, he made his debut with Buriram United in 2-0 away win against Chonburi. In December 2022, Aung Thu cancelled the contract with Buriram United.

Club

International career

Youth
Aung Thu debuted in national U-16 team that took part in 2011 AFF U-16 Youth Championship.

In 2014, his crucial goal against U-19 Vietnam at the Hassanal Bolkiah Trophy tournament for ASEAN Youth Football Championship in Brunei and would lead Myanmar to emerge as the champion of 2014 Hassanal Bolkiah Trophy. He then became a Myanmar Fans' favorite striker. His performance led Myanmar to the international participation and the U-19 Myanmar National team participation to the FIFA U-20 World Cup, and it was Myanmar's first international football match after its last participation in the 1972 Summer Olympics in Munich, Germany. He was noted for his powerful shots and intelligent runs in FIFA technical study book of 2015 FIFA U-20 World Cup.

Senior
He made his international debut in Myanmar national team on 28 August 2015 against United Arab Emirates national football team in a friendly tournament. His first goal as a Myanmar national team player was scoring against Laos, 3–1 in 2018 FIFA World Cup qualification.

International

Age ( 19 years 03 months 06 days )

International goals
Scores and results list Myanmar's goal tally first.

Honours
National Team
AFC Asian Cup : 0000
FIFA World Cup : 0000

Club
Yadanarbon
Myanmar National League: 2016

Buriram United
Thai League 1: 2021–22
Thai FA Cup: 2021–22
Thai League Cup: 2021–22

Individual
AFF Youth Player of the Year: 2015
Myanmar Player of the Year: 2014, 2015, 2016, 2017 
Myanmar National League Player of the Year: 2015, 2016, 2017

International
Myanmar U20
Hassanal Bolkiah Trophy: 2014

Personal life
Aung Thu married Burmese actress Poe Ei Ei Khant on 31 May 2018; the wedding ceremony was held on 26 March 2019 at the Western Park. They gave birth to their first son Thwin Oo Han on 19 July 2019.

References

External links

1996 births
Living people
Burmese footballers
Myanmar international footballers
Association football forwards
Yadanarbon F.C. players
Police Tero F.C. players
Muangthong United F.C. players
Buriram United F.C. players
Lamphun Warriors F.C. players
People from Mandalay Region
Burmese expatriate footballers
Burmese expatriate sportspeople in Thailand
Expatriate footballers in Thailand
Footballers at the 2018 Asian Games
Competitors at the 2017 Southeast Asian Games
Asian Games competitors for Myanmar
Southeast Asian Games competitors for Myanmar